Mark Thomas Williams (born 10 November 1978) is an English former footballer who played in the Football League for Rochdale and Rotherham United.

References

1978 births
Living people
English footballers
Association football defenders
English Football League players
Footballers from Liverpool
Tranmere Rovers F.C. players
Barrow A.F.C. players
Rochdale A.F.C. players
Rotherham United F.C. players
Hereford United F.C. players
Chester City F.C. players